Zigityak (Yegetäk) is a rural locality (a selo) in Subkhankulovsky Selsoviet, Tuymazinsky District, Bashkortostan, Russia. The population was 279 as of 2010. There are 5 streets.

Geography 
Zigityak is located 11 km southeast of Tuymazy (the district's administrative centre) by road. Nurkeyevo is the nearest rural locality.

References 

Rural localities in Tuymazinsky District